Pteronia ("resin daisies") is a genus of evergreen, woody perennial plants assigned to the family Asteraceae with currently 76 described species. Like in almost all Asteraceae, the individual flowers are 5-merous, small and clustered in typical heads, surrounded by an involucre of bracts. In Pteronia, the centre of the head is taken by relatively few, yellow, disc florets, while a ring of ligulate florets is absent. These florets sit on a common base (or receptacle).

Taxonomy 
A species of Gombos was first described and assigned to the new genus Pteronia by the famous Swedish naturalist Carl Linnaeus in the second edition of his groundbreaking Species Plantarum, the starting point of modern botanical nomenclature, that was published in 1763. He had not seen living plants or dried herbarium specimens, but based his description on an etching made by the English botanist Leonard Plukenet in 1700. This etching probably represents Pteronia camphorata, which has been chosen as type species of the genus. In 1917, John Hutchinson and Edwin Percy Phillips revised the genus and recognised 61 species.

Description
It mostly has hairless or variably hairy or glandular, wand-like (or virgate) branches, but sometimes the branches have wider angles (or divaricate). The leaves are mostly arranged in a cross, in some in a spiral or alternate, and rarely opposite and may also be hairless, variously hairy and glandular, or have a row of hairs around the margin.

Ecology
Gombos species can mostly be found in dry habitats.

Distribution
The species of Pteronia can be found in Botswana, Eswatini, Mozambique, Lesotho, Namibia, South Africa, Zambia and Zimbabwe. About 50 species occur in the Cape Floristic Region, particularly in the Succulent Karoo and to a lesser extend in the Nama Karoo biomes. In Namibia 24 species are found.

Species list
It contains the following species:

Pteronia acuminata
Pteronia acuta
Pteronia adenocarpa
Pteronia ambrariifolia
Pteronia anisata
Pteronia aspalatha
Pteronia beckeoides
Pteronia bolusii
Pteronia callosa
Pteronia camphorata
Pteronia centauroides
Pteronia ciliata
Pteronia cinerea
Pteronia cylindracea
Pteronia diosmifolia
Pteronia divaricata
Pteronia eenii
Pteronia elata
Pteronia elongata
Pteronia empetrifolia
Pteronia erythrochaeta
Pteronia fasciculata, Paraffienbos
Pteronia fastigiata
Pteronia flexicaulis
Pteronia foleyi
Pteronia glabrata
Pteronia glauca, Geelboegoekaroo
Pteronia glaucescens
Pteronia glomerata
Pteronia gymnocline
Pteronia heterocarpa
Pteronia hirsuta
Pteronia hutchinsoniana
Pteronia incana, Asbos
Pteronia inflexa
Pteronia intermedia
Pteronia leptospermoides
Pteronia leucoclada
Pteronia leucoloma
Pteronia lucilioides
Pteronia membranacea
Pteronia mooreiana
Pteronia mucronata
Pteronia oblanceolata
Pteronia onobromoides, Boegoebos
Pteronia oppositifolia
Pteronia ovalifolia
Pteronia pallens, Scholtzbos
Pteronia paniculata, Gombos
Pteronia pillansii
Pteronia polygalifolia
Pteronia pomonae
Pteronia punctata
Pteronia quinqueflora
Pteronia rangei
Pteronia scabra
Pteronia scariosa
Pteronia smutsii
Pteronia sordida
Pteronia spinulosa
Pteronia stoehelinoides
Pteronia stricta
Pteronia succulenta
Pteronia tenuifolia
Pteronia teretifolia
Pteronia tricephala
Pteronia uncinata
Pteronia undulata
Pteronia unguiculata
Pteronia utilis
Pteronia villosa
Pteronia viscosa

Gallery

References

 
Asteraceae genera
Taxonomy articles created by Polbot